The following is a list of majority leaders of the North Dakota House of Representatives, a position that was created in 1930 and first filled in 1931.

Notes

External links
State of North Dakota official website

Government of North Dakota

Majority
N